Final Pardon (Italian: Ultimo perdono) is a 1952 Italian drama film directed by Renato Polselli and starring John Kitzmiller, Franca Marzi, Adriano Rimoldi.  The film's sets were designed by the art director Vittorio Valentini.

Synopsis
An ex-convict believes he is employed to recruit young woman to work as dancers in a nightclub. He discovers he is in fact working for a gangster opperating in the white slave trade. Amongst the girls he comes across, the ex-convict encounters a daughter he never knew he had.

Cast
 Adriano Rimoldi as Renato Rocchi
 Franca Marzi as 	Moglie di Renato
 Olga Gorgoni as 	Amante del proprietario del night club
 Dante Maggio as 	Proprietario del night club
 John Kitzmiller as 	Ballerino
 Silvio Bagolini	
 Renato Malavasi  	
 Paola Borboni		
 Harry Feist	
 Andrea Petricca	
 Simona Andreassi		
 Jenny Folchi 		
 Cesira Sainati

References

Bibliography 
 Chiti, Roberto & Poppi, Roberto. Dizionario del cinema italiano: Dal 1945 al 1959. Gremese Editore, 1991.
 Morreale, Emiliano. Così piangevano: Il cinema melò nell'Italia degli anni cinquanta. Donzelli Editore, 2011.

External links 
 

1952 films
Italian drama films
1952 drama films
1950s Italian-language films
Films directed by Renato Polselli
1950s Italian films